Cila may refer to:
 Čilá, a village in the Plzeň region of the Czech Republic 
 CILA-FM, a Catholic radio station in Quebec
 Jordan Cila (born 1982), American soccer player, played for various American clubs
 Renato Cila (born 1951), Brazilian soccer player, played for Corinthians, Atlético Madrid, and various North American clubs

See also
 CILA
 Cilla
 Sila (disambiguation)